Golden Screen Award may refer to:

Goldene Leinwand, a German film certification for film ticket sales,
Golden Screen Award (Canada), a Canadian film award presented to the year's top-grossing Canadian film.
Golden Screen Award (Israel), an Israeli television award between 1994 and 2005 by Pnai Plus magazine.